Gareth McAuley (born 14 October 1992) is a Northern Irish skeet shooter.

Early life
Gareth McAuley was born in Ballymoney, County Antrim in 1992.

Career
McAuley started his shooting career at Route Gun Club, Ballymoney at the age of 16 in 2009, shooting English Skeet, and progressed onto Olympic Skeet the following year. McAuley qualified for his first Commonwealth Games and won a bronze medal at the 2018 Commonwealth Games in the skeet event. McAuley is also a two time Home International winner in Olympic Skeet, winning the event in 2016 at Lispopple CPC, Dublin and in 2018 at National Shooting Centre of Scotland.

He is also a Commonwealth European Champion, winning the event in Dungannon, Northern Ireland in 2018.  He qualified for the Great Britain team for the first time in 2022, for the ISSF World Cups in Rabat, Morocco and Nicosia, Cyprus.

References

External links

1992 births
Living people
Shooters at the 2018 Commonwealth Games
Male sport shooters from Northern Ireland
Commonwealth Games bronze medallists for Northern Ireland
Commonwealth Games medallists in shooting
People from Ballymoney
Sportspeople from County Antrim
Medallists at the 2018 Commonwealth Games